The National Democratic Alliance Army (NDAA) is an insurgent group in eastern Shan State, Myanmar (Burma). It is the armed wing of the Peace and Solidarity Committee (PSC).

History 
The Mong La area had been under the control of several warlords since the 1960s. The NDAA was formed in 1989 after splitting from the former Communist Party of Burma (CPB). The strength of the army is 3,000 to 4,000 men.

The NDAA was one of the first groups to sign a ceasefire with the Tatmadaw (Myanmar Armed Forces). After the ceasefire, the area underwent an economic boom, and the NDAA had benefited financially from increased opium harvests and narcotics trafficking. The NDAA declared an opium ban in the Mong La region in 1997 and signed a new ceasefire with the Myanmar government in 2011.

The NDAA maintains close ties with other rebel armed groups that split from the CPB, such as the Myanmar Nationalities Democratic Alliance Army (MNDAA), the New Democratic Army - Kachin (NDA-K), and the United Wa State Army (UWSA). In 2008 the UWSA was strongly against giving away the area of Mong Pawk from its control because it serves as a link with its ally, the National Democratic Alliance Army in Mong La.

Notes

References

External links
 Wa, Mongla rebels say Burmese army undermining peace process
 Tensions Rise in Wa Region
 Market Growth and Moral Decline in Mong La
 Dirty Old Town

Rebel groups in Myanmar
Rebel groups that actively control territory
Paramilitary organisations based in Myanmar
1989 establishments in Myanmar